Copala Triqui is a Trique language primarily spoken in the municipality of Santiago Juxtlahuaca, Oaxaca, Mexico. A 2007 estimate by SIL International placed the number of Copala Triqui speakers at 25,000 in Mexico.

Geographic distribution

Greenfield, California 
Immigrants from Oaxaca have formed a large Copala Triqui speaking community in the city of Greenfield, California. A bi-monthly Triqui language class was piloted at the Greenfield Public Library in 2010.

References

External links 
Gramática Popular del Triqui de Copala

Trique language
Indigenous languages of Mexico
Endangered Oto-Manguean languages